An untitled Mephisto television special is an upcoming American television special created for the streaming service Disney+, based on the Marvel Comics featuring the character of the same name. It is intended to be the third Marvel Studios Special Presentation in the Marvel Cinematic Universe (MCU), sharing continuity with the films and television series of the franchise. The special was produced by Marvel Studios.

Sacha Baron Cohen stars in the special as Mephisto, reprising his MCU role. Cohen was rumored to have been cast in the role in October 2022, to appear in the Disney+ series Ironheart, with the potential to reprise the role in future projects. A special centered on the character was revealed to be shooting in March 2023, alongside production of the series Agatha: Coven of Chaos at Trilith Studios in Atlanta, Georgia.

Cast 
 Sacha Baron Cohen as Mephisto

Production

Development 
In October 2022, Deadline Hollywood reported that Sacha Baron Cohen had joined the Marvel Cinematic Universe (MCU), in a role that would see him potentially first appear in the later episodes of the Disney+ series Ironheart (2023) followed by appearances in other MCU projects. His role was likely to be the character Mephisto, which would be portrayed by Baron Cohen in-person as well as through CGI. A Marvel Studios Special Presentation television special centered on Mephisto was revealed to be filming in March 2023 by Jeff Sneider of Above the Line.

Casting 
Cohen was expected to reprise his role as Mephisto in the special.

Filming 
The special was said to be filming by March 2023, using the set of the Disney+ series Agatha: Coven of Chaos, which was filming at Trilith Studios in Atlanta, Georgia.

Release 
The special will be released on Disney+.

References 

2020s American television specials
2020s English-language films
2020s superhero films
American horror television films
Demons in film
Demons in television
Disney+ original films
Marvel Studios Special Presentations
Television shows filmed at Trilith Studios
Television shows filmed in Atlanta
Television shows filmed in Georgia (U.S. state)
Upcoming television specials